William Keepers Maxwell Jr. (August 16, 1908 – July 31, 2000) was an American editor, novelist, short story writer, essayist, children's author, and memoirist.  He served as a fiction editor at The New Yorker from 1936 to 1975.  An editor devoted to his writers, Maxwell became a mentor and confidant to many authors.

Early life
Maxwell was born in Lincoln, Illinois on August 16, 1908.  His parents were William Keepers Maxwell and Eva Blossom (née Blinn) Maxwell.  During the 1918 flu epidemic, the 10-year-old Maxwell became ill and survived, but his mother died.  After his mother's death, the boy was sent to live with an aunt and uncle in Bloomington, Illinois.  His father remarried, and young Maxwell joined him in Chicago.  He attended Senn High School.  He received his B.A. summa cum laude from the University of Illinois in 1930 where he was class salutatorian, elected to Phi Beta Kappa, poetry editor of The Daily Illini, and a member of Sigma Pi fraternity. Maxwell earned an A.M. at Harvard University. Maxwell taught English briefly at the University of Illinois where he served as faculty advisor to his fraternity and published an article about it in the fraternity's magazine before moving to New York.

Career
Maxwell was best known for being a fiction editor of The New Yorker magazine for forty years (1936–1975), where he worked with writers such as Sylvia Townsend Warner, Vladimir Nabokov, John Updike, J. D. Salinger, John Cheever, Mavis Gallant, Frank O'Connor, Larry Woiwode, Maeve Brennan, John O'Hara, Eudora Welty, Shirley Hazzard, and Isaac Bashevis Singer. Welty wrote of him as an editor: "For fiction writers, he was the headquarters."

He also wrote six novels, short stories and essays, children's stories, and a memoir, Ancestors (1972). His fiction has recurring themes of childhood, family, loss, and lives changed quietly and irreparably. Much of his work is autobiographical, particularly concerning the loss of his mother when he was 10 years old and growing up in rural Midwestern United States.  After the flu epidemic, young Maxwell had to move away from his house, which he referred to as the "Wunderkammer" or "Chamber of Wonders". He spoke of his loss, "It happened too suddenly, with no warning, and we none of us could believe it or bear it ...  the beautiful, imaginative, protected world of my childhood swept away."

In 1968, Maxwell was elected president of the National Institute of Arts and Letters.

Maxwell was a friend and correspondent of the English writer Sylvia Townsend Warner, and was her literary executor. He edited a volume of her letters, and a further volume of his correspondence with her, The Element of Lavishness, was published in 2001.

Since his death in 2000, several biographical works about him have been published, including A William Maxwell Portrait: Memories and Appreciations (W. W. Norton & Co., 2004),  My Mentor: A Young Man's Friendship with William Maxwell by Alec Wilkinson (Houghton-Mifflin, 2002), and William Maxwell: A Literary Life by Barbara Burkhardt (University of Illinois Press, 2005).

In 2008, the Library of America published the first of two collections of works by Maxwell, Early Novels and Stories, edited by Christopher Carduff.  His collected edition of Maxwell's fiction, published to mark the writer's centenary, was completed by publication of the second volume, Later Novels and Stories, in the fall of 2008.

Personal life
William Maxwell married Emily Gilman Noyes of Portland, Oregon. Emily Maxwell was an accomplished painter, winning the Medal of Honor in 1986 from the National Association of Women Artists. She also reviewed children's books for The New Yorker. The couple were married for 55 years. Maxwell died eight days after his wife. They had two daughters, Katherine and artist and curator Emily Brooke ("Brookie") Maxwell. William Maxwell died on July 31, 2000 in New York City.  The epitaph marking his memorial gravestone in Oregon reads, "The Work is the Message".

Bibliography

Novels 
 Bright Center of Heaven (1934)
 They Came Like Swallows (1937)
 The Folded Leaf (1945)
 Time Will Darken It (1948)
 The Chateau (1961)
 So Long, See You Tomorrow (1980)
Omnibus editions
 Early Novels and Stories: Bright Center of Heaven / They Came Like Swallows / The Folded Leaf / Time Will Darken It / Stories 1938–1956 (Library of America, 2008) 
 Later Novels and Stories: The Château / So Long, See You Tomorrow / Stories and Improvisations 1957 – 1999 (Library of America, 2008)

Short fiction 
Collections
 The Heavenly Tenants (1946)
 The French Scarecrow (1956)
 Stories (1956)
 The Old Man at the Railroad Crossing and Other Tales (1966)
 Over by the River, and Other Stories (1977)
 Five Tales (1988)
 Billie Dyer and Other Stories (1992)
 All The Days and Nights: The Collected Stories of William Maxwell (1995)
Stories

Non-fiction 
Essays and reporting

 The Outermost Dream (1989)
Memoirs
 Ancestors: A Family History(1972)

Children's books 
 The Heavenly Tenants (1946)
 Mrs. Donald's Dog Bun and His Home Away from Home (1995)

———————
Notes

Awards and honors 
1947 Newbery Medal runner-up for The Heavenly Tenants
1980 William Dean Howells Medal for So Long, See You Tomorrow,
1982 National Book Award for So Long, See You Tomorrow 
1984 Brandeis Creative Arts Award 
1995 PEN/Malamud Award
1995 Mark Twain Award

References

Further reading 
 Baxter, Charles, Michael Collier and Edward Hirsch (eds.). A William Maxwell Portrait: Memories and Appreciations. New York: Norton, 2004.  
 Burkhardt, Barbara (ed.). Conversations with William Maxwell. Jackson: University Press of Mississippi, 2012. 
 Burkhardt, Barbara. William Maxwell: A Literary Life. Urbana: University of Illinois Press, 2005. 
 Henson, Darold Leigh. "Social Consciousness in William Maxwell's Writings Based on Lincoln, Illinois", Journal of the Illinois State Historical Society, vol. 98, mo. 4 (Winter 2005):254–286.
 Marrs, Suzanne (ed.). What There Is to Say We Have Said: The Correspondence of Eudora Welty and William Maxwell. Boston: Houghton Mifflin Harcourt, 2011.
 Wilkinson, Alec. My Mentor: A Young Man's Friendship with William Maxwell. Boston: Houghton-Mifflin, 2002.

External links

 William Maxwell, The Paris Review
 The Gentle Realist, The New York Times
 Imperishable Maxwell, The New Yorker
 Love, Bill, Chicago Magazine
 A Master is Given His Due, The Wall Street Journal
 William Maxwell, the 'Wisest, Kindest' Writer, NPR interview with Maxwell by Terri Gross
 
 
 
 
 William Keepers Maxwell, Find A Grave 
 Emily Noyes Maxwell, Find A Grave

1908 births
2000 deaths
University of Illinois alumni
University of Illinois Urbana-Champaign alumni
Harvard University alumni
20th-century American novelists
American male novelists
The New Yorker people
The New Yorker editors
Newbery Honor winners
People from Lincoln, Illinois
Novelists from Illinois
National Book Award winners
PEN/Malamud Award winners
Journalists from Illinois
20th-century American male writers
20th-century American non-fiction writers
American male non-fiction writers
20th-century American journalists
American male journalists